Karthika Deepam is a Hindu festival of lights.

Karthika Deepam may also refer to:
Karthika Deepam (film), an Indian Telugu-language film
Karthika Deepam (Telugu TV series), a 2017 Indian Telugu-language TV series
Karthika Deepam (Malayalam TV series), a 2020 Indian Malayalam-language TV series